Phan Wannamethee (born 30 January 1923) is a Thai diplomat who served as the sixth secretary-general of ASEAN between 1984 and 1986.

Education
Phan Wannamethee graduated from Oberlin College with a bachelor's degree in history and a master's degree in international relations from the University of California, Berkeley.

Secretary-General of ASEAN
As Secretary-General of the Association of Southeast Asian Nations (ASEAN), he played an important role and is behind the draft of the Treaty of Amity and Cooperation in Southeast Asia.

Royal decorations
  Knight Grand Cross (First Class) of The Most Admirable Order of the Direkgunabhorn

References

1923 births
Living people
Phan Wannamethee
Secretaries-General of ASEAN
Thai expatriates in the United States
Oberlin College alumni
University of California, Berkeley alumni